Derby is a 1971 American documentary film directed by Robert Kaylor about the world of professional roller derby in the 1970s. The film is also known as Roller Derby in the United Kingdom.

Plot summary

Cast
Ann Calvello as herself
Lydia Clay as herself
Janet Earp as herself
Eddie Krebs as himself
Charlie O'Connell as himself
Butch Snell as himself
Christina Snell as herself
Mike Snell as himself

See also
 List of American films of 1971

External links

1971 films
Roller derby films
American sports documentary films
1971 documentary films
Documentary films about women's sports
1970s English-language films
1970s American films